Hyllisia antennata is a species of beetle in the family Cerambycidae. It was described by Johan Christian Fabricius in 1801.

References

antennata
Beetles described in 1801
Taxa named by Johan Christian Fabricius